Michael Wallerstein (16 January 1951 – 7 January 2006) was a noted political scientist and the son of psychoanalyst Robert S. Wallerstein and psychologist Judith Wallerstein. He was also the cousin of the American sociologist Immanuel Wallerstein.

Education 
Wallerstein received his undergraduate education at the Stanford University, majoring in political science and graduating in 1974. He received his graduate training in political science at the University of Chicago. After receiving his Ph.D. in 1985, he was affiliated with UCLA.

Career 
In 1994, he moved to Northwestern University, and finally moved to Yale University in 2004, where he was named as Saden Professor.

Research 
Wallerstein's research concerned inequality in advanced industrial societies. In particular, he studied the impact of labor market institutions, such as systems of collective bargaining, as well as the politics of income redistribution, such as social insurance and affirmative action.

He and Karl Ove Moene suggested that citizens don't see public pensions, unemployment insurance and sickness insurance as a form of residual redistribution from the rich to poor, but as a personal warranty to maintain their standard of living in the event of a job loss, an illness, or old age.

Wallerstein continued the school of thought founded by his dissertation advisor Adam Przeworski and inspired by the democratic theory of Joseph Schumpeter, along with Michael Wallerstein, Stathis Kalyvas, Jose Cheibub, Leonard Wantchekon.

Awards 
Wallerstein was awarded the Franklin L. Burdette Pi Sigma Alpha Award in 1985 for the best paper presented at the American Political Science Association's 1984 annual meeting, and he later served on the APSA executive council. In 2005, he was elected to the American Academy of Arts and Sciences.

References

Selected bibliography 
  (PhD thesis)

External links
 Obituary from Yale Bulletin and Calendar
 Obituary from Yale Daily News
 Obituary from Chicago Tribune

1951 births
2006 deaths
Stanford University alumni
American political scientists
20th-century political scientists